Korb is a municipality in Baden-Württemberg, Germany

Korb can also refer to:
KORB, radio station in California, United States
Korb River, river in Minnesota, United States

People with the name
Anu Korb (born 1950), Estonian folklorist
Arthur Korb (1909-2003), American songwriter
Chris Korb (born 1987), American soccer player
Darren Korb (born 1983), American songwriter
Flóris Korb (186-1930), Hungarian architect
Hans-Henning Korb (born 1988), German artist
Julian Korb (born 1992), German footballer
Kristin Korb, American jazz singer and double-bassist
Lawrence Korb (born 1939), American defense specialist
Pierre Korb (1908-1980), French footballer
Ron Korb, Canadian flautist
Sascha Korb (born 1983), German footballer
Valeri Korb (born 1954), Estonian politician

See also
Kaie Kõrb (born 1961), Estonian ballerina

Occupational surnames
Surnames from nicknames